This is a list of all 1,469 hromadas of Ukraine that were formed in 2020 (excluding Kyiv, Sevastopol and hromadas in the Autonomous Republic of Crimea). A hromada is designated urban hromada if its administration is located in a city; settlement hromada if it is located in an urban-type settlement (occasionally called towns), and rural hromada if it is located in a selo or another rural settlement.

Cherkasy Oblast

Chernihiv Oblast

Chernivtsi Oblast

Dnipropetrovsk Oblast

Donetsk Oblast

Ivano-Frankivsk Oblast

Kharkiv Oblast

Kherson Oblast

Khmelnytskyi Oblast

Kirovohrad Oblast

Kyiv Oblast

Luhansk Oblast

Lviv Oblast

Mykolaiv Oblast

Odesa Oblast

Poltava Oblast

Rivne Oblast

Sumy Oblast

Ternopil Oblast

Vinnytsia Oblast

Volyn Oblast

Zakarpattia Oblast

Zaporizhzhia Oblast

Zhytomyr Oblast

External links
 Law of Ukraine No. 807-IX. Про утворення та ліквідацію районів . Verkhovna Rada.
 Decentralization in Ukraine. Informational portal about the decentralization reform
 Details. Ukrainian decentralization portal.

Hromadas of Ukraine
Hromadas